The Amboy Overpass was a historic bridge in North Little Rock, Arkansas. Built in 1941, it carried MacArthur Drive (Arkansas Highway 365) across the railroad tracks of the Union Pacific Railroad in the northwestern part of the city. The carrying piers and abutments were all fashioned out of reinforced concrete, and a concrete balustrade ran along each side of the deck. Due to structural deficiencies, the bridge was demolished and replaced by a new bridge in 2017.

The bridge was listed on the National Register of Historic Places in 1995, and was delisted in 2022.

See also
National Register of Historic Places listings in Pulaski County, Arkansas
List of bridges on the National Register of Historic Places in Arkansas

References

Road bridges on the National Register of Historic Places in Arkansas
Bridges completed in 1941
Buildings and structures in North Little Rock, Arkansas
National Register of Historic Places in Little Rock, Arkansas
Concrete bridges in the United States
1941 establishments in Arkansas